Cedar Point is a village in LaSalle County, Illinois, United States. The population was 266 at the 2020 census, down from 277 at the 2010 census. It is part of the Ottawa Micropolitan Statistical Area. North of town was the Cedar Point Mine, which operated from 1906 to 1924.

History 
The LaSalle Carbon Coal Company sunk the Number 5 Mine in 1906. The village was incorporated in 1922. The mine closed in 1924.

Geography

Demographics

As of the 2020 census there were 266 people, 100 households, and 49 families residing in the village. The racial makeup of the village was 88.72% White, 1.13% African American, 1.88% from other races, and 8.27% from two or more races. Hispanic or Latino of any race were 4.89% of the population.

There were 100 households, out of which 41.00% had children under the age of 18 living with them, 27.00% were married couples living together, 9.00% had a female householder with no husband present, and 51.00% were non-families. 45.00% of all households were made up of individuals, and 27.00% had someone living alone who was 65 years of age or older. The average household size was 2.90 and the average family size was 2.12.

The village's age distribution consisted of 20.3% under the age of 18, 11.3% from 18 to 24, 24.4% from 25 to 44, 20.8% from 45 to 64, and 23.1% who were 65 years of age or older. The median age was 41.6 years. For every 100 females, there were 103.8 males. For every 100 females age 18 and over, there were 122.4 males.

The median income for a household in the village was $51,250, and the median income for a family was $68,125. Males had a median income of $52,250 versus $22,500 for females. The per capita income for the village was $26,851. About 12.2% of families and 14.6% of the population were below the poverty line, including 11.6% of those under age 18 and 20.4% of those age 65 or over.

References

 
Villages in Illinois
Ottawa, IL Micropolitan Statistical Area
Villages in LaSalle County, Illinois